Prescription for Murder may refer to:

 "Prescription for Murder", a 1958 episode of M Squad
 "Prescription for Murder", a 1990 episode of Hardball
 "Prescription for Murder", a 1998 episode of an anime Case Closed
 Prescription for Murder, a 2000s book based on real-life murders by Harold Shipman, written by journalists Brian Whittle and Jean Ritchie
 Prescription for Murder, a 2013 novel based on the television series Murder, She Wrote, written by Donald Bain

See also
 "Prescription: Murder", a 1968 television pilot film of Columbo